Weiser High School is the only high school in Weiser, Idaho. In 2006, it had an enrollment of 514 in grades 9–12. Every June, it hosts the National Oldtime Fiddlers' Contest & Festival.

 the school takes students who live in Annex, Oregon.

Athletics
The following sports are offered at Weiser High School:

Baseball (boys)
Basketball (boys and girls)
Cross Country (coed)
Football (boys)
Golf (coed)
Soccer (boys and girls)
Softball (girls)
Tennis (coed)
Track (coed)
Volleyball (girls)
Wrestling (boys and girls)

Notable alumni
 Donald Anderson - Idaho Supreme Court justice (1955–56)
 Herman Welker - U.S. Senator from Idaho (1951–57). Class of 1924
 Roger Batzel - Director (1971–88) of Lawrence Livermore National Laboratory. Class of 1940
 Harold Ryan - U.S. District Judge - District of Idaho (1981–95). Class of 1941.

References

External links

Weiser School District

Public high schools in Idaho
Schools in Washington County, Idaho
Weiser, Idaho
Education in Malheur County, Oregon